H. verticillata may refer to:
 Hedyotis verticillata, a plant species
 Hydrilla verticillata, the Esthwaite waterweed or hydrilla, an aquatic plant species

See also